John Bertram Adams may refer to:

 John Bertram Adams (physicist) or Sir John Adams (1920–1984), British accelerator physicist
 John Bertram Adams (baseball) or Bert Adams (1891–1940), American baseball player

See also
 John Adams (disambiguation)